Robert L. Boss (born October 19, 1983) is a former American football coach and player. In 2006, he played for the af2's Green Bay Blizzard. Boss graduated from Northern Michigan University.

High school years
Boss attended Charlevoix High School in Charlevoix, Michigan, and was a letterman in football, basketball, baseball, and track&field. In football, as a senior, he won All-Conference honors and was named the Team MVP. In basketball, he led his team to the Class C semifinals as a junior, and won All-Conference honors as a senior. In baseball, he grabbed All-Conference honors as a senior.

2006 stats
As of August 27, 2006 (Includes playoffs)

Offense

Defense

References

External links
 Finlandia profile
 AFL stats from arenafan.com

1983 births
Living people
American football fullbacks
American football linebackers
Chicago Rush players
Chicago Slaughter players
Finlandia Lions football coaches
Green Bay Blizzard players
Northern Michigan Wildcats football coaches
Northern Michigan Wildcats football players
St. Norbert Green Knights football coaches
People from Charlevoix, Michigan
Players of American football from Michigan